Kherwara Chhaoni is a census town in the Udaipur district in the Indian state of Rajasthan. It is part of the Vagad region, which includes the districts of Dungarpur, Banswara and parts of Udaipur district. It is in close proximity to two major highways, National Highway 8 and Rajasthan State Highway 76 and National Highway 927A passes through it. Its name derives from the large number of Kher (Khair) trees in the region in the past.

Prominent institutions in the area are Mewar Bhil Corps and Police Training School (PTS).

Geography
Kherwara Chhaoni is a sub-division in the Udaipur district located just 80 km (50 mi) from the Rajasthan-Gujarat border. The topography of the area consists of medium to high rocky hills, contours, plains and is surrounded by Aravalli Range from north to south. The hill have forests that are an essential source of income and help sustain the economy of the local tribal inhabitants. There are many well-developed villages, such as Jawas, Chhani, Bawalwada, and Karawara among others.

Most rain falls during the monsoon season from July to September. Relative humidity is above 70% during the monsoon months but below 20% during the months of March through May.

The area is particularly rich in mineral resources, such as Green Marble (Serpentinite), Soapstone and Asbestos. Private companies use semi-mechanized and manual methods for mining operations.

Connectivity
It is located on National Highway 8 which connects it to Mumbai and Delhi. Rajasthan State Road Transport Corporation services also provide road connectivity via public transport. The nearby railway stations are Dungarpur and Udaipur with trains available for major routes. The nearest airports are Dabok and Ahmedabad.

Demographics
As per the 2011 Indian census, the population of Kherwara Chhaoni was 6,649 individuals living in 1,323 households. Out of this, 52% (3,457) were male and 48% (3,192) were female. Out of the total population, 14% were under 6 years of age and 72% were literate (a rate higher than the national average of 59.5%). The break-up of literate residents was 79% male and 64% female.

History
The name of Kherwara Chhaoni derives from the large number of Kher (Khair) trees in the region once upon a time. The main rulers of the area in the past were Jawas Thikana

Prominent institutions in the area are Mewar Bhil Corps and Police Training School (PTS). The Mewar Bhil Corps paramilitary training station also served as headquarters for the Assistant Political Agent and had the whole Bhomat area under its direct political supervision. Civil control over the Bhomat area remained with Maharana.

Culture
Kherwara is part of the Vagad region, which includes the districts of Dungarpur, Banswara and parts of Udaipur district. The area is predominantly inhabited by Meena, Bheel (Bhil), Muslim, Brahmin, Meghwal, Panchal, Kalal, Jain, [[Prajapat (Kumhar)]] and Patel communities. The main dialect of the area is Wagdi (Vagdi).

The main occupation of the residents of this area is agriculture. Its Proximity to National Highway 8 also helps business ventures.

Jama Masjid ( Sunni ) is located in the middle of the town near Main old market. The Temple of Mataji (Kilewali) and Lord Shiva is located at Godavari River. Khadkwa Mata temple and Jain temple are located at Chhaoni-Chhitora (Badla) on Rani-Chhaoni road. The state government has contributed to the development of Khadkwa Mata temple.

Education
The Industrial Training Institute for vocational training is located at Badeshwar (distance from Tehsil headquarters). There is a nursing college and two other colleges offering Bachelor of Education degree. Udaipur and Ahmedabad are preferred locations for higher education.

There are many schools in the region with medium of instruction in both Hindi and English. Major schools are Vidyaniketan Upper Primary School, Rajkiya Uccha Madhyamik Vidyalaya, Eden International School, Vikas Public School, and The Nobles School. The Government School Chhani is well known with many notable alumni, such as former education minister Dr. Dayaram Parmar. Villages in the region also have smaller schools providing good education.

References

External links 
 http://www.censusindia.gov.in/PopulationFinder/View_Village_Population.aspx?pcaid=638&category=C.T.

Cities and towns in Udaipur district